Admiral Group plc is a British financial services company headquartered in Cardiff, Wales. Listed on the London Stock Exchange, it is a constituent of the FTSE 100 Index, and markets the Admiral, Bell, Elephant, Diamond and Veygo vehicle insurance brands, as well as launching the price comparison services Confused.com and Compare.com. The group employs more than 10,000 people across its brands.

History 
The business started as a division of the Brockbank Group in 1991. In November 1999, Henry Engelhardt led a management buy-out of the Admiral Group from the Brockbank Group backed by Barclays Private Equity. On 23 September 2004, Admiral floated on the London Stock Exchange.

In September 2004, the Admiral Group plc announced the pricing of its initial public offering, at an offer price of 275 pence per existing ordinary share. Based on the offer price, the market capitalisation of Admiral at the commencement of dealings on the London Stock Exchange was £711 million.

On 13 May 2015, it was announced that Engelhardt, would step down as CEO, and be replaced in 2016 by David Stevens, the COO.

On 1 January 2021, David Stevens stepped down as CEO to be replaced by Milena Mondini de Focatiis.

In April 2021, Admiral finalised the sale of interests, that included its Cardiff-based price comparison firm Confused.com, to RVU for proceeds of £508m.

References

External links 

Financial services companies established in 1991
1991 establishments in Wales
Companies based in Cardiff
Financial services companies of Wales
Insurance companies of the United Kingdom
Companies listed on the London Stock Exchange
Private equity portfolio companies
Welsh brands
British companies established in 1991
Financial services companies of the United Kingdom